The Sexual revolution was a social movement that challenged traditional codes of behavior related to sexuality and interpersonal relationships.

Sexual revolution may also refer to:

Sexual revolution in 1960s United States
"Sexual Revolution" (song)", 2001 Macy Gray song
"Sexual Revolution" (Roger Waters song), from the 1984 album The Pros and Cons of Hitch Hiking
"Sexual Revolution", a song by Army of Lovers from the 1994 album Glory, Glamour and Gold